Cipuropsis amicorum is a species of flowering plant in the family Bromeliaceae, native to Venezuela. It was first described in 1990 as Tillandsia amicorum.

References

Tillandsioideae
Flora of Venezuela